Rozi may refer to:
Razi, Ardabil, a city in Iran
Rozi Khan, Pashtun Barakzai tribal leader in Afghanistan
Fatrurazi Rozi (b. 1978), Malaysian footballer
MV Rozi, tugboat
Lozi language, also known as Rozi, a Bantu language
Rozi(company), a technology company